The 2017 PRO Chess League Season was the inaugural season of the PRO Chess League. It started on January 11, 2017, and ended March 26. 48 teams participated, twelve of which had previously participated in the USCL. After the end of the first season, the St. Louis Arch Bishops defeated the Norway Gnomes, thus securing their first title. The PCL has a total prize fund of $50,000 compared to a prize fund of $10,000 in the USCL.

Standings

Playoffs 
After the end of the regular season, the top six teams from each division qualify for the playoffs with each team being seeded 1–6 based on regular season wins.

Eastern division

Central division

Atlantic division

Pacific division

Semifinals and championship 

During the semifinal round, regardless of the participating teams, the winner of the Eastern Division played the winner of the Central Division, and the winner of the Atlantic Division played the winner of the Pacific Division.

Awards

References 

2017 in chess